Somerset is a village in St. Croix County, Wisconsin, along the Apple River. The population was 2,635 at the 2010 census. The village is located within the Town of Somerset.

History
Somerset was named by General Samuel Harriman after his father's home of Somerset, England.  Somerset has a lengthy and colorful history. Before the turn of the century Somerset was bordered on the south by cranberry bogs. The terrain naturally lent itself to the production of cranberries as a result of the hilliness of the area, which is dotted with ponds, sloughs, swamps and bogs. These wet areas became of greater interest to the local population during Prohibition. These same low spots where water collected became ideal for collecting water for the production of moonshine (homemade alcoholic beverages). Indeed, Somerset already had a history of being a rough logging town, and it was only a natural progression to become the supplier of bootlegged alcohol to the twin cities of Saint Paul and Minneapolis. After Prohibition ended, the citizens of Somerset returned to the more humble activities of logging and farming.

Geography
Somerset is located at  (45.125189, -92.6752).

The Apple River runs through Somerset.

Wisconsin Highways 35 and 64, and County Roads C, I, and VV are main routes in the community.

Demographics

2010 census
As of the census of 2010, there were 2,635 people, 990 households, and 654 families living in the village. The racial makeup of the village was 93.1% White, 1.0% African American, 0.6% Native American, 0.8% Asian, 2.0% from other races, and 2.5% from two or more races. Hispanic or Latino of any race were 5.1% of the population.

There were 990 households, of which 44.6% had children under the age of 18 living with them, 43.8% were married couples living together, 14.8% had a female householder with no husband present, 7.4% had a male householder with no wife present, and 33.9% were non-families. 23.8% of all households were made up of individuals, and 6% had someone living alone who was 65 years of age or older. The average household size was 2.64 and the average family size was 3.15.

The median age in the village was 29.6 years. 32.1% of residents were under the age of 18; 8.7% were between the ages of 18 and 24; 36.3% were from 25 to 44; 17.4% were from 45 to 64; and 5.5% were 65 years of age or older. The gender makeup of the village was 48.9% male and 51.1% female.

2000 census
As of the census of 2000, there were 1,556 people, 635 households, and 391 families living in the village. The racial makeup of the village was 96.85% White, 0.77% Black or African American, 0.45% Native American, 0.06% Asian, 0.45% from other races, and 1.41% from two or more races. 1.16% of the population were Hispanic or Latino of any race.

There were 635 households, out of which 39.4% had children under the age of 18 living with them, 40.8% were married couples living together, 14.3% had a female householder with no husband present, and 38.4% were non-families. 26.8% of all households were made up of individuals, and 8.2% had someone living alone who was 65 years of age or older. The average household size was 2.45 and the average family size was 2.99.

In the village, the population was spread out, with 30.1% under the age of 18, 13.4% from 18 to 24, 36.8% from 25 to 44, 12.9% from 45 to 64, and 6.9% who were 65 years of age or older. The median age was 27 years. For every 100 females, there were 93.3 males. For every 100 females age 18 and over, there were 94.8 males.

The median income for a household in the village was $45,194, and the median income for a family was $47,426. Males had a median income of $36,827 versus $25,605 for females. The per capita income for the village was $19,170. About 6.3% of families and 7.3% of the population were below the poverty line, including 7.8% of those under age 18 and 29.0% of those age 65 or over.

Government
Somerset's village president is John Melvin.

Education
Somerset High School serves students in grades nine through twelve. Somerset Middle School is the local middle school for students in grades five through eight. Somerset Elementary School is the local elementary school for students in junior kindergarten through fourth grade. All of these schools are located on the Somerset School district campus.

Recreation
Somerset has several camping establishments along the Apple River. Outfitters in the area provide rentals and transportation for tubing on the river. Every summer concerts are held at the Somerset Amphitheater. The Avett Brothers, Slipknot, and Pretty Lights are previous headliners. Somerset also hosts the Tough Mudder and The Border Battle Beer Fest. Every June, Somerset also holds its annual Pea Soup Days. There's a carnival, parade, and late night band playing. It takes place in the Village Park.

Notable people
 Jenny Hansen, NCAA All-Round Gymnastic Champion
 Samuel Harriman, Union Army general
 Sam Lofquist, ice hockey player
 Michael Schachtner, basketball player

References

External links
 Village of Somerset, Wisconsin

Villages in St. Croix County, Wisconsin
Villages in Wisconsin